The women's discus throw events at the 2019 World Para Athletics Championships were held in Dubai in November 2019.

Medalists

Detailed results

F11

F38

F41

F53

F55

F57

F64

See also 
List of IPC world records in athletics

References 

discus throw
2019 in women's athletics
Discus throw at the World Para Athletics Championships